Grotesco is a Swedish comedy group and the name of a comedy series that the group recorded 3 seasons for, under SVT, it aired between Autumn of 2007 and 2017. As well as this, the group also participated as break entertainment in Melodifestivalen 2009 (The Melody Festival - A Swedish festival to determine the 49th song to represent Sweden in the Eurovision Song Contest), and released a CD with different variants of the hit song Tingeling, which headlined in the break entertainment.

On 15 January 2015, they had the premiere for their first stage performance "Grotesco på Scala - en näradödenrevy" (Grotesco at Scala - a near-death revue) in the Scala Theatre in Stockholm. On 3 September 2015, it was confirmed that Grotesco would do a third season of their TV series.

Controversy
On 5 November 2010, Grotesco released a music video, Blanda Upp (meaning "Mix It Up"), which involved foreigners dancing to a rapper and a singer performing the national anthem while dancing in a sexual manner atop a black man, as a parody of media reports over the increasing foreign minorities in the country.

References

External links
Official website

Internet memes
Swedish comedians
2007 Swedish television series debuts
2010 Swedish television series debuts